Guotong Zhou is a Chinese engineer from the Georgia Institute of Technology in Shenzhen. She was named a Fellow of the Institute of Electrical and Electronics Engineers (IEEE) in 2012 for her contributions to the analysis of nonlinear systems and signals.

Education 
B. Sc. Degree in Biomedical Engineering and Instrumentation, Tianjin University, July 1989.
University of Virginia M.Sc. Degree in Biophysics (May 1992), M.Sc. Degree in Electrical Engineering (January 1993), and Ph.D. Degree in Electrical Engineering (January 1995)

References 

Fellow Members of the IEEE
Living people
Georgia Tech faculty
21st-century Chinese engineers
University of Virginia School of Engineering and Applied Science alumni
Year of birth missing (living people)